Ryan D'Imperio (born August 15, 1987) is a former American football fullback. He was drafted by the Minnesota Vikings with the 237th overall pick in the seventh round of the 2010 NFL Draft. He played college football at Rutgers University. He finished his career playing 12 NFL Games with 2 receptions and 7 total yards gained.

College career
After receiving a high school degree while attending at Washington Township High School in Sewell, New Jersey, D’Imperio came to Rutgers and made an instant impact at linebacker. The true freshman appeared in all 13 games as the Scarlet Knights enjoyed an 11–2 season in 2006 and won their first bowl championship. Throughout his college career, D'Imperio recorded 177 total tackles, 6 quarterback sacks, and 2 interceptions, including one returned for a touchdown. After his junior year, D'Imperio was voted to the Second Team All-Big East.

Professional career

Minnesota Vikings
D'Imperio was drafted as a linebacker 237th overall in the 2010 NFL Draft by the Minnesota Vikings. D'Imperio chose to wear the number 44, the same number he wore in both high school and college. Rather than play linebacker, Viking's coach Brad Childress, thought D'Imperio would be better suited playing Fullback on the offensive side of the ball. D'Imperio spent the 2010 season on the Vikings Practice Squad. On September 3, 2011, Ryan D'Imperio was waived by the Vikings during final cuts before the start of the 2011 NFL season and added to the practice squad. On October 4, 2011, D'Imperio was promoted to the active roster.

On August 31, 2012, D'Imperio was released during final roster cutdowns due to an injured shoulder.

Kansas City Chiefs
D'Imperio signed with the Kansas City Chiefs on March 21, 2013. D'Imperio was released from the Kansas City Chiefs on May 13, 2013

New York Giants
On July 26, 2013, D'Imperio signed with the New York Giants. On August 13, 2013, the Giants announced that he had retired.

References

External links
Minnesota Vikings bio 
CBS Sports bio
College Stats
The Comeback Kid

1987 births
Living people
American football fullbacks
American football linebackers
Kansas City Chiefs players
Minnesota Vikings players
New York Giants players
People from Washington Township, Gloucester County, New Jersey
Players of American football from New Jersey
Rutgers Scarlet Knights football players
Sportspeople from Gloucester County, New Jersey
Washington Township High School (New Jersey) alumni